Live at O2 Shepherds Bush Empire is KT Tunstall's sixth live album, recorded on 9 November 2016. It features many tracks from her previous albums, with the second half of the double album containing many tracks from her 2016 release KIN. Tunstall was accompanied by a three-piece band consisting of Rachel Eckroth on keyboard, Solomon Dorsey on bass, and Denny Weston Jr. on drums.

Release
The album was recorded and mixed by Max Butcher for Live Here Now. Fans were able to purchase the CD at the show and pick it up directly after the show finished. The CD was at one point available through KT Tunstall's PledgeMusic store.

Track listing

Disc One

Disc Two

References

KT Tunstall albums
2016 live albums